Zavlani (Greek: Ζαβλάνι) is a neighbourhood in the northeastern part of the city of Patras,  direct and  via road from the downtown core.  The neighbourhood bears the football (soccer) club team named A.P.S. Zavlani and plays in the prefectural fourth division.

Nearest places

Skioessa, northeast

Nearest neighbourhoods

Sychaina, north
Gouva, south
Anthoupoli, west

Information

The name is the corruption the name Zavr(l)os (Ζαβρ(λ)ος). During the Ottoman rule, the area was settled by Albanians. Another theory of the name is that comes from a family name Zavlanis, which descended from the island of Zakynthos.

Geography

Zavlani is in a hilly residential setting with forests to the north.

History

The area were made up farmlands until when housing developments arrived in the 1960s and the 1970s, the housing and its population slowed in the late-1980s.  Its main production consisted of olive, cattle and fruits and vegetables as well as other crops and the populationm before the arrival of the housing developments were rural, today they are manufacturing and services especially outside the neighbourhood.

Sporting clubs

APS Zavlani

References
The first version of the article is translated and is based from the article at the Greek Wikipedia (el:Main Page)

Neighborhoods in Patras